"Bart-Mangled Banner" is the twenty-first and penultimate episode of the fifteenth season of the American animated television series The Simpsons. It first aired on the Fox network in the United States on May 16, 2004.

Plot
Homer and Marge take the kids to get their shots. Just before Dr. Hibbert is about to inject Bart, he escapes. After a chase through town, Hibbert finally outsmarts Bart, by having Barney wear a latex mask, and finally injects him. The shot, however, causes Bart's earholes to swell shut as a side effect, making him temporarily deaf. Hibbert also tricks Homer into signing a malpractice waiver. Marge wanted Bart to stay home from school the next day; however, Bart wants to play in the donkey basketball game.

While at the Springfield Elementary School donkey basketball game, Bart taunts a donkey with a carrot, unaware that the school is reciting the national anthem. After he places the carrot in his shorts, the donkey takes it and rips off Bart's shorts. While Bart is bent over to keep his privates covered with his shirt, the US flag is put up behind him and a photo is taken, which results in the crowd assuming that Bart is mooning the US flag. Shortly afterwards, the Springfield Shopper takes the story and completely turns it around, making it seem as if Bart had deliberately mooned the flag. Marge tries to tell Skinner that Bart was deaf at the time; however, because of Bart's history of similar pranks, Skinner doesn't believe it. Bart and his family soon are hated by all of Springfield.

The Simpsons are later asked to appear on a talk show and tell their side of the story. Homer advises Marge to not take it too far. However, the host asks, instead, "What part of America do you hate most?" (an example of the fallacy of many questions).  Marge says that, if by Americans you mean loud mouth talkshow hosts which everyone seems to be, then yes she DOES hate the Americans. She also said that she is well liked in Springfield, prompting the host to say that Springfield hates the US. The US then turns their back on Springfield (though there is widespread celebration in praise of Springfield in the Middle East), so Mayor Quimby frantically decides to change the name of Springfield to "Liberty-ville." Everything in town is quickly patriotized; the traffic light colors are changed to red, white, and blue, and everything costs $17.76. While at church, Lisa speaks her opinion about patriotism, and the Simpsons are arrested by SWAT, in violation of the "Government Knows Best Act."

The Simpsons are taken to the "Ronald Reagan Re-education Center", a prison which houses Michael Moore, the Dixie Chicks, Elmo, Al Franken, and Bill Clinton, as well as a man who moans "My only crime was driving a van full of explosives in from Canada!". Marge feels bad that she took it too far after Homer warned her not to. With some help from the last-registered Democrat, the Simpsons escape the prison (in a parody of the escape scene from The Blues Brothers), but realize that the re-education center is actually Alcatraz Prison. While they are swimming to land (choosing to swim to Oakland instead of San Francisco because they "aren't made of money"), they are picked up by a French freighter and are brought to France. They are well adjusted, but still miss the United States, mainly because it is where all their stuff is. They then move back to the US dressed as 19th century immigrants from Europe where Homer speaks of plans of integration into the United States.

Cultural references

 The episode title is a play on the title of the U.S. National Anthem, "The Star-Spangled Banner".
 The scene where Dr. Hibbert chases Bart in a cropduster mirrors a scene in the 1959 Alfred Hitchcock thriller, North by Northwest.
 When Homer is playing minigolf, a man at the golf court calls him Benedict Arnold.
 As Homer is leaving the golf course, he smashes the United States Capitol and the Mount Rushmore National Memorial.
 The cable debate show "Headbutt" that the Simpsons appear on is a reference to the CNN debate show Crossfire with Nash Castor being a parody of then-current host Tucker Carlson.
 When thinking about changing Springfield's name, Mayor Quimby refers to "Hitler City, NC", which (according to him) also changed its name to Charlotte.
 The "Government Knows Best" act satirizes the controversial 2001 legislation, the Patriot Act, aimed at fighting terrorism in the United States and abroad.
 Those imprisoned include Michael Moore, The Dixie Chicks, Bill Clinton, and the Sesame Street muppet character Elmo.
 As the Simpsons are watching the re-educational cartoon, Lisa mentions that she has been given Sodium pentothal which is sometimes used during interrogations as a truth serum.
 Bill Clinton's attempt to smoke 100 cigarettes at once is a reference to the Guinness World Records.
 The Simpsons are scheduled to perform at the prison talent show after Al Franken.
 At the talent show, the Simpsons start singing "America the Beautiful" and then switch to their own original song.
 During her performance, Lisa burns an ACLU card.
 The entire performance is a parody of The Sound of Music where the cast escapes from the Nazis.
 As the family is swimming away from the prison, the Golden Gate Bridge is visible in the background, implying that the prison itself was Alcatraz (though Alcatraz stopped being used as a prison in 1963). The family also debates whether to swim towards San Francisco, likely because of its socially liberal policies, or towards Oakland because of affordability.
 As they are being rescued by the French sailor, Marge makes a reference to Catherine Deneuve, a French actress.
 When Dr. Hibbert chases Bart, "One Way or Another" by Blondie is played. Neil Diamond's "America" plays to the closing credits.
 The renaming of Springfield to Libertyville is likely a reference to the renaming of french fries to "freedom fries" after Jacques Chirac refused to have France participate in Operation Iraqi Freedom.
 After the city changes its name, Apu changes his octuplets' names to "Lincoln", "Freedom", "Condoleezza", "Coke", "Pepsi", "Manifest Destiny", "Apple Pie" and "Superman", claiming their previous names to be "pre-witchhunt", and the family's last name to McGillicuddy.

Previous episode references
The dress worn by Marge in Paris is the one she bought from the Chanel shop (after the one she found at the outlet shop got chewed up in the sewing machine) in season seven's "Scenes from the Class Struggle in Springfield".
The term "Bart-Mangled Banner" was previously used in the episode "Bart vs. Lisa vs. the Third Grade" when Bart destroys Lisa's flag project.

External links 
 

The Simpsons (season 15) episodes
2004 American television episodes
Cultural depictions of Bill Clinton
Basketball animation